is a passenger railway station in the city of Abiko, Chiba Prefecture Japan, operated by the East Japan Railway Company (JR East).

Lines
Fusa Station is served by the Abiko Branch Line of the Narita Line, and is located 12.1 kilometers from the terminus of branch line at Abiko Station.

Station layout
The station is an elevated station with dual opposed side platforms. The station building is built on a cantilever above and across the platform. The station is staffed.

Platforms

History
Fusa Station was opened on April 1, 1901 as a station on the Narita Railway Company for both freight and passenger operations. On September 1, 1920, the Narita Railway was nationalised, becoming part of the Japanese Government Railway (JGR).  After World War II, the JGR became the Japan National Railways (JNR). Scheduled freight operations were suspended from October 1, 1962. The station was absorbed into the JR East network upon the privatization of the Japan National Railways (JNR) on April 1, 1987. The station building was rebuilt in 1993, and modernized from 2005–2006.

Passenger statistics
In fiscal 2019, the station was used by an average of 3156 passengers daily.

Surrounding area
 
 Abiko Higashi High School

See also
 List of railway stations in Japan

References

External links

 JR East station information 

Railway stations in Japan opened in 1901
Railway stations in Chiba Prefecture
Narita Line
Abiko, Chiba